The Saturn Award for Best Fantasy Television Series is one of the annual awards given by the American Academy of Science Fiction, Fantasy & Horror Films. The Saturn Awards, which are the oldest film and series-specialized awards to reward science fiction, fantasy, and horror achievements, included the category for the first time at the 42nd Saturn Awards ceremony, when the Saturn Award went through major changes in their television categories. It specifically rewards fantasy on television.

Since the award was introduced in 2015, Outlander was the only series to win until Game of Thrones in 2019. As of the 47th Saturn Awards, the category was split to recognize both network/cable series and streaming series.

Winners and nominees 
The winners are listed in bold.

(NOTE: Year refers to year of eligibility, the actual ceremonies are held the following year)

2010s

2020s

Most nominations
 5 nominations – The Magicians, Outlander
 4 nominations – Game of Thrones
 3 nominations – The Good Place
 2 nominations – American Gods, The Witcher

Most wins
 3 wins – Outlander

See also
 Saturn Award for Best Streaming Science Fiction, Action & Fantasy Series

References

External links
 Official site

Saturn Awards